There are over 20,000 Grade II* listed buildings in England. This is a list of these buildings in the London Borough of Richmond upon Thames.

Almshouses

|}

Bridges

|}

Churches, memorials and tombs

|}

Royal Botanic Gardens, Kew

|}

Other buildings

|}

See also
 Grade I listed buildings in Richmond upon Thames

Notes

References

External links
 

 
Lists of Grade II* listed buildings in London